Osogovka is a Macedonian folk dance and its music, rhythm, costumes and geographical originate from the villages of Osogovo Mountain. The costumes are clean white, and the music is performed by orchestra of bagpipes followed by a folk orchestra.

Macedonian dances